Ho Lap College, HLC, is a band-one grant-aided co-educational grammar school in San Po Kong, Kowloon, Hong Kong. Founded in 1969, it is a well-established secondary school in the area. In particular, HLC enjoys the status of one of the few "English as the Medium of Instruction" (EMI) school in the Kowloon district.

History
Ho Lap College is the first government-aided secondary school sponsored by the Sik Sik Yuen. Its history dates back to 1961, when a committee was set up to deal with the establishment of a new school. Mr. Wong Wan-tin was elected as the committee's Chief Commissioner. With government funding, the school's foundation stone laying ceremony took place on 7 October 1966, the birthday of Master Wong Tai Sin. Mr. David MacDougall, Registrar General, was the guest of honour. That year was significant as it marked the 45th anniversary of Sik Sik Yuen. When Ho Lap College opened on 1 September 1969, it had 12 classes of about 500 Form1 to Form3 students. The opening ceremony was held in the same year in December, with Mr. J. Canning, former Director of Education, as the guest of honour.

In order to provide students with a better learning environment, two major improvement programmes were implemented. In 1987, Sik Sik Yuen's board of directors granted HK$6,000,000 for the construction of a new wing in the otherwise car-park area. The construction work started in early November 1989 and was completed in July 1991. The school had the honour to have Mr. Lan Hon-tsung, Regional Secretary, to open the new wing on 26 September 1991. The new wing consists of a number of dedicated facilities: Home Economics Room, Design and Technology Room, Science Laboratory, a computer room as well as two remedial teaching classrooms. The school's facilities have been further enhanced under the School Improvement Programme (SIP) in 1997. A green plot was redeveloped into a new annex, with the addition of a new staff room, a conference room and four classrooms. A room on the ground floor was also reserved for the Parents Teachers Association Resource Centre, which hugely helps strengthen the relationship between the parents and the school. The annex under SIP was officially opened by Dr. Cheung Wing-ming on 26 November 1999, the school's 30th anniversary.

Thanks to the donations of Sik Sik Yuen's board of directors, alumni, teaching staffs, students, and parents, an air-conditioned gym was set up in 2004 as a celebration of the school's 35th anniversary.

A nursery originally next to the annex has been converted into an English-Corner area in 2005. Over the years, it has been proven to improve students’ English standard by allowing students to use the language in a relaxing and intellectually stimulating setting.

Administrative history
Mr. Wong Cheuk-yin laid the foundations of Ho Lap College in 1969. One year later, Mr Choi Kwok-ping was appointed the principal. Consequently, the school was led by Mr. Choi for almost six years. Then, Mr. Chau Kai-lun succeeded the position and continued to serve the school until August 2000. Mr. Ng Sui-kou then took up the post of principal in September in the same year. Since 2005, Mr. Jacky Ling Kin-chun has been the principal, continuing the effort of bringing the school to a brighter future. Ms Keung Yuen Kwan, Agnes is the next principal starting from 2012, however many of her policies in school were quite controversial.

School facilities
The school comprises 26 classrooms, 2 remedial rooms, 5 laboratories, 2 Multimedia Learning Centres, a Computer Room, a Geography Room, an Art and Design Room, a Music Room, a Design and Technology Room, a Home Economics Room, a Library, a Student Activity Room, an Interviewing Room, a Staff Common Room, a PTA Resources Room, a Conditioning Centre and a School Hall. All the classrooms, the School Hall and the special rooms are air-conditioned.

The Sik Sik Yuen has been promoting Information Technology (IT) in education. A network has been set up in the school building to link up over 200 computers and 100 notebooks. To facilitate teaching and learning, both staff and students can have access to the Internet in all the staff rooms, classrooms and special rooms through a lease line.

School newsletter
Resonance is the de facto school newspaper of Ho Lap College. it is published twice a year, covering students' contributions with topics ranging from science and arts to interesting school news.

Besides, in 2007, students established Wan Fung(雲峰), a magazine that wholly managed and owned by student. However, due to lack of contribution from other students, it eventually discontinued in 2011.

Achievements
Ho Lap College is a Band-1 co-educational grammar school in Hong Kong. Students of HLC have always excelled academically. Ho Lap College has a few current students and alumni who achieved 8As in HKCEE and 4As in HKALE. The school also provide students with an environment to foster a well-rounded development, offering guidance in morality and encouraging participation in extra-curricular activities such as various sports, dancing and drama.

Drama and sports
The Drama Club, Basketball, Swimming and Dance Teams have won numerous prizes in the 40-year school history.

Houses

School location and transportation
The school is located at: No. 15 Tseuk Luk Street, San Po Kong, Kowloon, Hong Kong, adjacent to the Hong Kong Examinations and Assessment Authority (No. 17 Tseuk Luk Street, San Po Kong, Kowloon, Hong Kong).

The following transportation options are available:
 Wong Tai Sin station (Exit C2) (approximately 15–20 minutes walking distance)
 Mini bus No. 20M (Wong Tai Sin station (Exit D2), near to the entrance of Temple Mall South (approximately 5–10 minutes))

Notable alumni

 Andy Lau (劉德華) — a Cantopop singer, actor and movie star in Hong Kong.
 Wong Yeung-tat (黃洋達) — a Hong Kong social activist and the founder and former leader of Civic Passion.

See also
 Sik Sik Yuen
 Ho Fung College
 Education in Hong Kong
 List of schools in Hong Kong

References

External links

Ho Lap College website

Educational institutions established in 1969
Secondary schools in Hong Kong
San Po Kong
Sik Sik Yuen
1969 establishments in Hong Kong
Confucian schools in Hong Kong
Buddhist schools in Hong Kong